Chatchai Plengpanich (born January 17, 1960) is a Thai film and television actor. He has appeared in many lakorns (Thai soap operas) and feature films.

Biography
Chatchai was born in Kanchanaburi Province. Having a police officer as a father meant that the family relocated around Thailand constantly throughout his childhood. He attended a prestigious boarding school in Nakhon Pathom (King's College), where he found his passion for rugby.

He became widely known for playing the role of Tee Yai, a real robber in the late '70s. Tee Yai's story was adapted into a TV drama in same name on Channel 5 in 1985.

He met his wife, Sinjai Plengpanich, on a movie set, in which they played the lead characters. They had many chance encounters during the next four years and decided to date each other. A year later, they decided to get married. They have three children.

Awards and nominations
 Winner, best actor, Hit Man File, Bangkok Critics Assembly, 2005
 Winner, best actor, Necromancer, Thailand National Film Awards, 2005
 Nominee, best actor, Hit Man File, Thailand National Film Awards, 2005

Trivia
Shares the same nickname with wife. Both are called Nok (translated as bird in English)
Has been credited on many sites as a voice actor in the film Over the Hedge, for an unnamed character. Despite this, he is not listed under any position in the official credits, nor is his voice recognized anywhere in the film. Why he is being referenced to the film is unknown at this time.

Partial filmography

Actor

Films
Vow of Death (Phii mai jim fun) (2007)
King Naresuan (2007)
Jom kha mung wej (Necromancer) (2005)
Sum muepuen (Hit Man File) (2005)
Zee-Oui (2004)
Taloompuk (2002)
The Legend of Suriyothai (2001)
Fah (1998)
Salween (1994)
Tawipob (1990)
Song for Chao Phraya (1990)
Raya (1981)

Drama TVB
Split Second (爭分奪秒) (2004) - Hong Kong Cantonese TVB television series with Sririta Jensen as "Sam"

Lakorns
Nuer Mek 2 (2012) - with Sinjai Plengpanich
Tawan Deard (2011) - with Sinjai Plengpanich
Koung Jak Rai Dok Bua (2007)
Sapai Part-time (2006)
Jao Sao Prissana (1999) - with Anne Thongprasom
Reun Mayura (1997) - with Kathaleeya McIntosh
Rom Chat (1995) - with Sinjai Plengpanich
Nai Fun (1992) - with Sinjai Plengpanich
Si Paen Din (1991) - with Jintara Sukkapat
Prissana (1987) - with Lalita Panyopas
Sai Lohit (1986)
Tee Yai (1985)
Rai Sanae-ha (1985)
Condominium (1984)

Director
Tawan Deard (2011)
Khun Chai Ronapee (2012)
Kum mun sanya (1993)
Jaiphisut (TBD)

Producer

Awards and nominations

External links
Official site

1960 births
Living people
Chatchai Plengpanich
Chatchai Plengpanich
Chatchai Plengpanich
Chatchai Plengpanich
Chatchai Plengpanich